Jane Soames (1900–1988), also known as Jane Soames Nickerson, was a British-born author, translator, and historian. A graduate of Oxford University, she was employed by The Times as a correspondent in Paris and was an assistant to Hilaire Belloc, author of The Servile State. Soames was married to Hoffman Nickerson (1888–1965), an Assemblyman in the 139th New York State Legislature. Soames also served as the librarian for the Oyster Bay Historical Society in Oyster Bay, New York.

Works

See also
 "The Doctrine of Fascism"

References

1900 births
1988 deaths
20th-century British women writers
British women historians
Alumni of the University of Oxford
The Times journalists
20th-century British translators
British emigrants to the United States